The Alagoas tyrannulet (Phylloscartes ceciliae) is a species of bird in the family Tyrannidae. It is endemic to the Atlantic Forest in eastern Brazil. Its natural habitat is subtropical or tropical moist lowland forest. It is threatened by habitat loss.

References

External links
BirdLife Species Factsheet.

Alagoas tyrannulet
Birds of the Atlantic Forest
Endemic birds of Brazil
Alagoas tyrannulet
Taxonomy articles created by Polbot